Ancilla thomassini is a species of sea snail, a marine gastropod mollusk in the family Ancillariidae, the olives and the likes.

Description

Distribution
This marine species occurs off Madagascar.

References

 Kilburn R.N. (1981). Revision of the genus Ancilla Lamarck, 1799 (Mollusca: Olividae: Ancillinae). Annals of the Natal Museum. 24(2): 349–463.

thomassini
Gastropods described in 1981